Vienna is a series of audio plays from Big Finish Productions. Vienna Salvatori, played by Chase Masterson, was introduced in the Monthly Range story The Shadow Heart. In February 2013 a single disc story featuring Vienna entitled The Memory Box was released, and was followed by a box set entitled Series One.

Episodes

Pilot (2013)

Series 1 (2014)

Series 2 (2015)

Series 3 (2016)

Series 4: Retribution (2017)

References

Audio plays based on Doctor Who
Big Finish Productions
Doctor Who spin-offs